Abortion is a controversial topic in Nigeria. Abortion in Nigeria is governed by two laws that differ depending on geographical location. Northern Nigeria is governed by The Penal Code and southern Nigeria is governed by The Criminal Code. The only legal way to have an abortion in Nigeria is if having the child is going to put the mother's life in danger. However, sex-selective abortion has long had acceptance in Nigeria.

Nigerian Law
Nigeria's abortion laws make it one of the most restrictive countries regarding abortion. Nigeria's criminal law system is divided between the northern and southern states of Nigeria.

The Criminal Code is currently enforced in southern states. The abortion laws of the Criminal Code are expressed within sections 228, 229, and 230. Section 228 states that any doctor providing a miscarriage to a woman is guilty of a felony and up to 14 years of imprisonment. Section 229 states that any woman obtaining a miscarriage is guilty of a felony and may be sentenced to imprisonment for up to 7 years. Section 230 states that anyone supplying anything intended for a woman's miscarriage is also guilty of a felony and maybe sentenced to up to 3 years of imprisonment.

The Penal Code operates in northern states, with abortion laws contained in sections 232, 233, and 234. The sections of the Penal Code parallel the Criminal Code, besides the exception for abortion with the purpose of saving the life of the mother. The Penal Code's punishments include imprisonment, fine, or both. The offenses of these codes are punishable regardless of whether the miscarriage was successful. No provisions have been made to the Criminal Code making exceptions for the preservations of the mother's life. However, the cases of Rex vs Edgar and Rex vs Bourne have made it generally accepted that abortion performed to preserve the mother's life is not an appropriate transgression of the Criminal Code.

Statistics
Since abortion only legal in Nigeria to save the life of the pregnant woman, many women resort to unsafe abortion methods, leading to abortion-related complications and increasing mortality and morbidity rates in the country. According to research done by the Guttmacher Institute, an estimated 456,000 unsafe abortions are done in Nigeria every year. In a joint study carried out by the Society of Gynecologists and Obstetricians of Nigeria and Nigeria's Ministry of Health, the number of women who engage in unsafe abortion was estimated at 20,000 each year. Research has revealed that only 40% of abortions are performed by physicians with improved health facilities while the remaining percentage are performed by non-physicians.

History
Throughout history, Nigeria's abortion laws have mobilized several groups and movements with opposing missions regarding the liberalization of abortion laws and promotion of women's rights. In the 1972 conference of the Nigerian Medical Association (NMA), the first attempts were made to reform abortion laws in Nigeria. However, a lack of support caused no revisions to result from this attempt. In 1975, the National Population Council further advocated for women's access to safe and legal abortion on the basis of promoting health and well-being of the mother. Defended by the NMA and the Society of Gynecologists and Obstetricians of Nigeria (SOGON), this sparked a controversy in 1976. At the yearly SOGON convention, the Prime Minister of Health gave a speech noting the possibility for national reform of abortion laws.

In 1981, the National Council of Women's Societies countered the SOGON's proposed bill regarding termination of pregnancy, preventing it from reaching the House of Representatives. The National Council of Women's Societies expressed that more efforts should be put towards family planning education and prevention of pregnancy outside of marriage. They expected parents of the House to enforce strong moral values for the country. In 1998, the Women's Health Research Network of Nigeria emerged with the purpose of promoting research and encouraging other groups to advocate and unite around women's health issues.

The Campaign Against Unwanted Pregnancy (CAUP) was created in 1991 with the mission of defending women's sexual and reproductive rights and eliminating unsafe abortion. In 1992, CAUP organized a reform meeting in which the Minister of Health and NMA president reviewed legislation regarding abortion. However, this reform was met with much opposition and was not successful. An important goal of the CAUP is public health education. In 1997, they established the Action Group for Adolescent Health (AGAH), in which they trained medical students to become public educators on sexual and reproductive health. From 1999 to 2004, CAUP organized many workshops and lectures on sexual health and women's rights with the hope of empowering Nigerian citizens with the knowledge to lead a healthy lifestyle and advocate for change. The focus of CAUP since 2002 has been abortion bill reform. A group of experts collaborated to outline changes in 2003. As of 2004, the bill was in its eighth stage of revision.

In 2015 The Violence Against Persons Prohibition Act (VAPP) was passed into law. This act is meant to provide sexual assault and relationship violence survivors with aid. This act is helping women get the contraceptives they need to prevent unwanted pregnancy, the leading cause for abortions.

Despite the combined and continued efforts of various Nigerian and International advocacy groups, only a woman whose life is endangered can undergo a legally performed abortion today.

Practices and consequences 
Many regions in Africa are known for their unsafe practices in health care and disease, specifically when it comes to young pregnant women and abortion. A major problem in these regions is that access to adequate health care is limited, meaning that options for safe health care practices are not easily accessible and some turn to unsafe methods of handling their pregnancies. Abortion accounts for 40% of maternal deaths in Nigeria, making it the second leading cause of maternal mortality in the country.

Health care systems in African countries have failed to make the proper changes to ensure a better future for their citizens. The government has either failed to make these issues a priority or they have attempted to introduce policies that had an opposite result of what was desired. Specifically in Nigeria, religious and cultural factors are major reasons behind the failure to address certain abortion issues.

Many of the issues surrounding unsafe abortion focus on adolescents. Although unsafe abortion practices do affect most of the sexually active women in the country, it is believed that adolescents may require special circumstances and could be a reason for change in this area. Adolescents are the most in need of these services; if they adopt safe practices to avoid unplanned pregnancy, these problems could start to decline. In Nigeria, teens are the most likely not to use contraceptives to avoid pregnancy and the most likely to turn to unsafe abortion practices.

Contraceptive use is a common issue for teens in Nigeria and there are no services to support this. Contraceptives are an important resource in a community where abortion and high fertility is an issue.

The need for increased access to safe abortion practices in Nigeria is very apparent. There are several different methods used to try and ensure a healthy and safe approach to abortions, but Nigeria has not always been able to keep up with the costs of these medical advances. In Nigeria, there are three first-trimester safe practices that are utilized to compare costs and effectiveness. Hospital-based dilatation and curettage, hospital-and clinic-based manual vacuum aspiration, and medical abortion using misoprostol are all considered to be a huge cost savings and ultimately in the mother's best interest.

Prior to women practicing these medically safer and more cost-effective methods, the rate of self-induced abortions was extremely high relative to other countries and regions. The side effects of using other methods have proved to be damaging to the mothers, resulting in high fevers, urinary tract infections, and genital trauma.

There are also issues where the women who did induce their own abortions did so incorrectly and could have caused other complications by overdosing on misoprostol – a method that is most commonly used safely and cost effectively. An important aspect to take into consideration is that Nigeria is a region where there are low health system requirements and where they strive to use non-surgical options.

Causes for abortion
Unwanted pregnancy is the leading cause for abortion in Nigeria. Unwanted pregnancies have many causes. Nigeria's growing economy and increasing urbanization is making the price of living higher. This is making it more necessary for women to be working, as well as the men, to help support the family. When there are more children it becomes harder for the women to focus on work because they are expected to take care of the family first, thus women would rather be working than pregnant or taking care of a child.
 
Another reason for the high rates of unwanted pregnancy in Nigeria is low contraceptive use and lack of family planning. Much of this is a result of lack of education on the use of contraceptives, as well as a lack of access to health care and contraceptive products in Nigeria. Due to the lack of contraceptive use, there is a trend of uneducated, young, childless women, and women with many children, who end up with unwanted pregnancies. Both of these groups of women live in rural areas, where healthcare is spread out, hard to find, and government campaigns to help educate the public on family planning and contraceptives do not get as much advertisement.
 
Nigerian women want around 6.7 children. They have 25 years from the ages of 20-45 where they are mostly likely to get pregnant. They spend around 15 of those years pregnant, trying to get pregnant, and not having sex immediately after pregnancy, as accustomed in Nigerian culture. This equates to them having around ten childbearing years where they do not want to be pregnant. Nigerian women have a long span of their life where an unwanted pregnancy can take place, thus these women need contraceptives to make sure an unwanted pregnancy will not occur.

However, it has also been acknowledged that sex-selective abortion has long been a common practice in Nigeria but  this practice of  sex-selective abortion  is gradually going into  extinct as education and civilization is playing a major role  in public enlightenment and awareness .

See also 
 Women in Nigeria
 Health in Nigeria

Further reading

References

Health in Nigeria
Nigeria
Nigeria
Birth control in Nigeria
Women's rights in Nigeria